Ventzio is a municipal unit of the Grevena municipality. Before the 2011 local government reform it was an independent municipality. The 2011 census recorded 1,969 residents in the municipal unit. Theodoros Ziakas covers an area of 323.277 km2. The seat of the municipality was in Knidi.

Population
According to the 2011 census, the population of Ventzio was 1,969 people, a decrease of 17% compared to the previous census of 2001.

References

Populated places in Grevena (regional unit)
Former municipalities in Western Macedonia

bg:Вендзи (дем)